John Larkin (born in 1726, probably at Hadlow in Kent; died in 1782) was a noted English cricketer of the mid-Georgian period at a time when the single wicket version of the game was popular.

He played for "the most famed parish of Hadlow", as the Hadlow Cricket Club was called in 1747, when he must have been one of its best players.  Larkin and another Hadlow player called Jones represented All-England v Kent at the Artillery Ground on 31 August 1747 (the result is unknown).

John Larkin seems to have had a lengthy career and was still playing club cricket in the 1770s.

References

External links
 Hadlow Cricket Club website

English cricketers
English cricketers of 1701 to 1786
Kent cricketers
1726 births
1782 deaths
Date of death missing
Place of death missing
Date of birth unknown
Non-international England cricketers
People from Hadlow